Cedrela odorata,  commonly known as Spanish cedar, Cuban cedar, or cedro in Spanish, is a commercially important species of tree in the chinaberry family, Meliaceae native to the Neotropics.

Classification

The genus Cedrela has undergone two major systematic revisions since 1960. The most recent revision reduced the number of species in the genus to seven (Styles, 1981).  Cedrela odorata L., contains 28 other synonyms, including C. mexicana M. J. Roem. The taxon "C. angustifolia," a very vigorous type now in demand because of its apparent resistance to the shootborer, was left in an indeterminate status due to insufficient herbarium material. The result is that C. odorata as now constituted is a species showing a high degree of population variation.

Distribution and habitat

Cedro is a tree of the New World tropics, appearing in forests of moist and seasonally dry subtropical or tropical biomes (24) from latitude 26°N on the Pacific coast of Mexico, throughout Central America and the Caribbean, to the lowlands and foothills of most of South America up to  altitude, finding its southern limit at about latitude 28°S in Argentina. It has become a troublesome invasive species in the Galapagos Islands. Individual trees are generally scattered in mixed semi-evergreen or semi-deciduous forests dominated by other species. Mahogany (Swietenia sp.), a close relative, is often found with cedro and both suffer damage from the same pest, the mahogany shootborer (Hypsipyla grandella).

Description
The trunk has a thick grey–brown bark, with longitudinal irregular grain.

Uses
Cedrela odorata is the most commercially important and widely distributed species in the genus Cedrela. Known as Spanish cedar in English commerce, the aromatic wood is in high demand in the American tropics because it is naturally termite- and rot-resistant. An attractive, moderately lightweight wood (specific gravity 0.4), its primary use is in household articles used to store clothing. Cedro heartwood contains an aromatic and insect-repelling resin that is the source of its popular name, Spanish-cedar (it resembles the aroma of the unrelated true cedars (Cedrus spp.) Cedro works easily and makes excellent plywood and veneer and would be more widely used if it could be successfully plantation grown. This plant is often used for honey production (beekeeping) and humidor construction. It is occasionally used for tops or veneers on some kinds of electric guitars. The wood is the traditional choice for making the neck of flamenco and classical guitars.

See also
 Cedar wood
 List of honey plants

References

External links

Cedro Hembra, Spanish-Cedar
Overview of Cedrela odorata

odorata
Trees of Mexico
Trees of South America
Trees of the Caribbean
Flora of the Atlantic Forest
Plants described in 1759
Taxa named by Carl Linnaeus
Flora of the Sierra Madre Occidental